Toby Sowery (born 30 June 1996 in Melbourn) is a British racing driver.

Career

Karting
Born in Melbourn, Sowery began karting in 2004 at the age of eight and claimed titles in Easykart, Junior TKM and Junior Rotax GP.

Lower Formulae
In 2014, Sowery graduated to single-seaters, beginning with the MSV F3 Cup, where he took the title with ten race wins and fourteen podiums. Later that year, Sowery partook in the MRF Challenge, in which he also claimed the title.

The following year, Sowery entered a few races MSA Formula with MBM Motorsport, where he finished fourteenth with eighty points.

In 2016, Sowery graduated to British F3 with Lanan Racing. There he claimed five victories and led the standings for a time before finishing third behind eventual champion Matheus Leist.

Sowery returned to the MRF Challenge in 2016-17 but only as a development driver working on future upgrades for the Championship.

Racing Record

Career summary

† As Sowery was a guest driver, he was ineligible for championship points.
* Season still in progress.

U.S. F2000 National Championship results

Pro Mazda Championship

Indy Lights

External links
 
 

1996 births
Living people
Sportspeople from Cambridgeshire
English racing drivers
MRF Challenge Formula 2000 Championship drivers
British F4 Championship drivers
BRDC British Formula 3 Championship drivers
U.S. F2000 National Championship drivers
Indy Pro 2000 Championship drivers
Indy Lights drivers
People from Melbourn
International GT Open drivers
Blancpain Endurance Series drivers
Team Pelfrey drivers
Juncos Hollinger Racing drivers
Team Lazarus drivers
Fortec Motorsport drivers
Italian F4 Championship drivers
HMD Motorsports drivers